Mang Yang is a district (huyện) of Gia Lai province in the Central Highlands region of Vietnam.

As of 2003 the district had a population of 43,734. The district covers an area of 1,126 km². The district capital lies at Kon Dơng. In 1954, at the end of the First Indochina War, Mang Yang was the site of a bloody battle won by the Viet Minh.

References

Districts of Gia Lai province